Mallar is a census town in Udupi district in the Indian state of Karnataka.

Demographics
As of 2001, India census, Mallar had a population of 6052. Males constitute 47% of the population and females 53%. Mallar has an average literacy rate of 75%, higher than the national average of 59.5%: male literacy is 80%, and female literacy is 71%. In Mallar, 10% of the population is under 6 years of age.

Nanopix

Cities and towns in Udupi district